Marguerite Bay or Margaret Bay is an extensive bay on the west side of the Antarctic Peninsula, which is bounded on the north by Adelaide Island and on the south by Wordie Ice Shelf, George VI Sound and Alexander Island. The mainland coast on the Antarctic Peninsula is Fallières Coast. Islands within the bay include Pourquoi Pas Island, Horseshoe Island, Terminal Island, and Lagotellerie Island.  Marguerite Bay was discovered in 1909 by the French Antarctic Expedition under Jean-Baptiste Charcot, who named the bay for his wife.

Named features 
Toadstool Rocks are a group of insular, ice-covered rocks that rise to about 250 cm above sea level in the southwest part of Marguerite Bay, east-southeast of Terminal Island. The rocks were roughly charted from RRS association with Mushroom Island and Puffball Islands.

Harvey Shoals are three shoal patches located between Miller Island and Northstar Island in Marguerite Bay. They were charted by the Hydrographic Survey Unit from RRS John Biscoe in 1966, and were named for Petty Officer Brian E. Harvey, the surveying recorder who carried out all the sounding for this survey.

References

Further reading 
 Stephen J. Livingstone, Colm Ó Cofaigh, Chris R. Stokes, Claus-Dieter Hillenbrand, Andreas Vieli & Stewart S.R. Jamieson, Glacial geomorphology of Marguerite Bay Palaeo- Ice stream, western Antarctic Peninsula, Journal of Maps, 9:4, 558–572, DOI: 10.1080/17445647.2013.829411 

Bays of Graham Land
Landforms of Adelaide Island
Fallières Coast